Merzouga is a small village in southeastern Morocco, about  southeast of Rissani, about  from Erfoud and about  from the Algerian border.

The village is known for its proximity to Erg Chebbi and is a popular destination for tourists. It has been described as "a desert theme park" and the Erg Chebbi as "a wonderland of sand". Merzouga has the largest natural underground body of water in Morocco.

In 2006, Merzouga experienced devastating flash floods, displacing 1,200 and resulting in some deaths.

History
Legend states that Merzouga once flourished as a tropical jungle until it was turned into a desert environment by God who punished families for refused offerings to a poor woman and buried them in the sand dunes of Erg Chebbi.

Merzouga was uninhabited but later became a transit point for merchants heading to Timbuktu. It later became a pilgrimage for the nomads of the Ait Atta tribes and eventually became a tourist destination.

Ancient fortified villages have existed in Merzouga for centuries. During French colonial rule fortifications were built by troops of the French Foreign Legion after the battles of Taflalet, which occurred between 1916 and 1932.

References

External links

http://www.merzouga.org/
Populated places in Errachidia Province
Oases of Morocco